Matthew Kerrigan (born 1943) is an Irish former Gaelic footballer and manager who played for the Summerhill club and at senior level for the Meath county team. He later had several successes as an inter-county manager.

Playing career
Kerrigan had an unconventional beginning to his inter-county career after failing to earn a call-up to the Meath minor football team. He later missed out in the under-21 grade as Meath didn't enter the Leinster Under-21 Championship at the time. Kerrigan first appeared for Meath as a member of the junior team that lost the 1964 All-Ireland home final, before making his senior debut against Louth during the 1966-67 National League. His debut season ended with a victory over Cork in the 1967 All-Ireland final. Kerrigan made a second All-Ireland final appearance in 1970, losing out to Kerry on that occasion, before claiming a National League title in 1975 and ending the season by being selected on the All-Star team. He also enjoyed success on the club scene as part of the Summerhill four-in-a-row team from 1974 to 1977. Kerrigan ended his career by winning a Leinster Club Championship title.

Managerial career
In retirement from playing, Kerrigan's management career included roles with various Meath teams in all grades, including the senior team, and he guided the minors and under 21s to a number of Leinster titles. Kerrigan also had spells in charge of Westmeath and Cavan.

He managed Westmeath for nearly four years, between 1992 and 1995.

Media career
He has worked as an analyst for LMFM.

Honours

Player
Summerhill
Leinster Senior Club Football Championship: 1977
Meath Senior Football Championship: 1974, 1975, 1976, 1977

Meath
All-Ireland Senior Football Championship: 1967
Leinster Senior Football Championship: 1967, 1970
National Football League: 1974-75
Leinster Junior Football Championship: 1964

Awards
All-Star: 1975

Manager
Meath
Leinster Minor Football Championship: 1980

Leinster
Railway Cup: 1996, 1997

References

1943 births
Living people
All Stars Awards winners (football)
Gaelic football managers
Gaelic games writers and broadcasters
Leinster inter-provincial Gaelic footballers
Meath inter-county Gaelic footballers
Summerhill Gaelic footballers